is a Japanese film duology and television miniseries, a spin-off from the Garo television series. The film is split into two portions. The film was also shown on the Japanese cable television channel Family Gekijo as a six-episode miniseries from March 5 through March 7, 2014, with two episodes shown each night.

Ray Fujita stars as the lead character Rei Suzumura, the Silver Fanged Knight Zero, reprising his role as the character from the previous television series and films. The films/miniseries explore this character who served a supporting role in the previous productions and his investigation of a joint human and Horror commune led by the Horror Ring.

Plot

Zero: Black Blood is set after the events of the film Garo: Soukoku no Maryu. Rei Suzumura, Zero the Silver Fanged Knight, is patrolling on his own when he encounters the white Horror Ring, who has created a commune where Horrors and humans live together in harmony, so long as one human a month allows themselves to be devoured by the Horrors. Rei, along with Makai Priest Cain and the knight-in-training Yuna are ordered by the Makai Senate to slay Ring and free the humans under his thrall by means of Yuna's mother the Makai Priestess Iyu.

Episodes

Cast
: 
: 
: 
: 
: 
: 
: 
: 
: 
: 
: 
: 
: 
: 
: 
: 
: 
: 
: 
: 
: 
: 
: 
: 
: 
, : 
:

Songs
Opening theme
"ZERO -BLACK BLOOD-"
Lyrics: Masami Okui
Composition: Hiroshi Kitadani
Arrangement: Masaki Suzuki
Artist: JAM Project

Ending theme

Lyrics: Ray
Composition: Dustz, L!TH!UM
Artist: Dustz

References

External links
 

2014 Japanese television series debuts
Garo (TV series)
Japanese horror films
Tokusatsu television series
2010s Japanese films